Cryptococcus may refer to:
 Cryptococcus (fungus), a fungus genus in the family Cryptococcaceae
 Cryptococcus (insect), an insect genus in the family Eriococcidae